Fanaa is a 2006 Indian Hindi–language romantic thriller film, directed by Kunal Kohli and produced by Aditya Chopra and Yash Chopra under their banner Yash Raj Films. The film stars Aamir Khan and Kajol, with Rishi Kapoor, Kirron Kher, Tabu and Sharat Saxena in supporting roles.

Khan's first film as an anti-hero, Fanaa follows a tourist guide in New Delhi named Rehan Qadri, who meets a Kashmiri woman, Zooni Ali Beg. Both fall in love, but are separated by a terrorist attack that reportedly kills Rehan. It is later revealed that he was not killed, but is in fact a Kashmiri insurgent, and is the mastermind behind the attacks. 7 years later, his organization, known as the "IKF", sends him on a mission in Kashmir, where he once again, in a strange twist of fate, meets Zooni.

Fanaa was one of the most expensive Bollywood films during its time of release. The film's title is derived from the Islamic Sufi term "fanaa", meaning "destroyed" in Arabic, Persian, Urdu, and Hindi. The film was promoted with the tagline "Destroyed In Love...". Khan and Kajol were romantically pairing for the first time with this film, but it marked their second collaboration after Ishq (1997), in which they were paired opposite Juhi Chawla and Ajay Devgn respectively. It also marked the comeback of Kajol, who was last seen in Karan Johar's Kabhi Khushi Kabhie Gham... (2001).

Fanaa released on 26 May 2006, and grossed over ₹1.03 billion at the box–office against a production and marketing budget of ₹300 million, thus becoming the sixth highest grossing Hindi film of 2006. The film proved to be a major commercial success, despite having been banned in the state of Gujarat due to protests against Khan for his comments criticizing the Gujarat government. It received positive reviews from critics, with praise for its direction, soundtrack, cinematography, costumes, styling and performances of the cast, with particular praise directed towards Kajol's performance; however its story, screenplay and pacing received some criticism.

At the 52nd Filmfare Awards, Fanaa received 4 nominations, and won 3 awards, including Best Actress (Kajol).

Plot 
Zooni Ali Beg is a blind Kashmiri woman who travels for the first time, to New Delhi, with her friends, Fatima "Fatty" Ali, Mehbooba "Bobo" Siddiqui, Rubina "Ruby" Ansari and their dance teacher Helen to perform in a ceremony for Republic Day. On her journey, she meets Rehan Khan, a tour guide who flirts with her. Although her friends warn Zooni about him, she falls in love. On her last night in Delhi, Rehan and Zooni spend the night together and end up making love. As Zooni is leaving the next day, Rehan comes and takes her away with him. Her parents arrive in Delhi to arrange their marriage. Zooni has a procedure done that helps get her eyesight back, but when she comes out of surgery, she finds out that Rehan was killed in a bomb blast in the city.

Malini Tyagi is a special intelligence agent brought in to assess the threat of the bomb blast, and the group responsible, an independent organization fighting for an independent Kashmir known as IKF. It is revealed that Rehan is the man who placed the bomb blast in motion, then faked his death so that Zooni wouldn't come looking for him. He admits that he loves Zooni, but also concedes that he can never see her again because of his dangerous life.

Seven years later, Rehan is on another mission for the IKF, which has acquired a nuclear weapon but needs to get hold of the trigger, known to be in the army's possession. Rehan steals it, but Tyagi has figured out his plan and sends forces to stop him. In the ensuing shootout, Rehan is injured. He makes his way to a remote house for help. It turns out to be Zooni's house. Zooni had become pregnant after Rehan's supposed death and has given birth to and raised her and Rehan's son (also named "Rehan" by Zooni). Zooni's mother had died two years prior to Rehan's return. Zooni and her father save him, though neither recognizes him as Zooni's old lover. Though initially distant from them, Rehan develops an affection for his son and the family.

Rehan eventually reveals his true identity to them, keeping the information of his terrorism under wraps. Initially hurt, Zooni refuses to let Rehan leave her again, and the two of them get married by the arrangement of her father. Tyagi has a report published about Rehan, warning the public that he is a terrorist. Zooni's father sees this report and confronts Rehan on finding the trigger in his pocket. Rehan accidentally throws Zooni's father off a ledge, killing him. He radios the IKF from an army officer's house but kills the officer when he discovers Rehan.

Zooni finds her father's body, and Rehan lies about his death. However, Zooni later sees the news report, and finds the trigger. She takes her son and flees to the officer's house, where she radios for help. Tyagi tells her to stop Rehan. Rehan arrives the next day, and takes the trigger from Zooni, saying the IKF will kill her and their son if he doesn't. As Rehan is about to give the trigger to the leader of IKF, Rehaan's maternal grandfather, Zooni shoots him in the leg. Rehan draws his gun on her, but can't bring himself to shoot. Zooni shoots him again, this time fatally, to stop him. In the nick of time, Tyagi arrives and stops the IKF from shooting Zooni. Rehan dies in Zooni's arms.

Zooni and her son later visit the graves of her father and Rehan, who are buried next to each other. When her son asks if his father was wrong, Zooni tells him that his father did what he thought was right.

Cast 

 Aamir Khan as Rehan Qadri Sr. / Rehan Khan / Captain Ranjeev Singh
 Kajol as Zooni Qadri (née. Ali Beg)
 Rishi Kapoor as Zulfikar Ali Beg, Zooni's father
 Kirron Kher as Nafisa Ali Beg, Zooni's mother
 Tabu as Malini Tyagi (Anti Terrorist Special Force)
 Sharat Saxena as Susheel Rawat (Anti Terrorist Special Force)
 Ali Haji as Rehan Qadri Jr., Rehan & Zooni's son
 Lillete Dubey as Helen
 Shruti Seth as Fatima "Fatty" Ali
 Sanaya Irani as Mehbooba  "Bobo" Siddiqui
 Gautami Kapoor as Rubina  "Ruby" Ansari
 Ahmed Khan as Nana Jaan, Rehan's grandfather
 Satish Shah as Colonel Maan Singh
 Jaspal Bhatti as Inspector Jolly Good Singh
 Vrajesh Hirjee as Balwaan Ahmed, Rehan's assistant
 Suresh Menon as Venkateshwar Atti Cooper Rao
 Shishir Sharma as Indian Defence Minister
 Salim Shah as Defence Secretary
 Deepak Saraf as Chief Minister
 Puneet Vasishth as Captain Ijaz Khan
 Shiney Ahuja as Major Suraj Ahuja (special appearance)
 Lara Dutta as Zeenat (special appearance)

Production

Filming Locations 
Fanaa was originally planned to be shot in Kashmir before Kajol backed out due to the continuing insurgency in that region. The director chose to move the Kashmir segment to the Tatra Mountains in southern Poland, which also provides suitably snowy and mountainous terrain. It was filmed at historical locations in Delhi including the Red Fort, Jantar Mantar, Qutub Minar, Purana Qila, Rashtrapati Bhavan and Lodhi Gardens.

Reception

Critical Reception 

At Rotten Tomatoes, the film holds a 100% rating critical approval rating, based on 7 reviews.

The performances of the leads, Aamir Khan and Kajol, as well as their on–screen chemistry were praised.

Music 

The music of Fanaa composed by Jatin–Lalit with Salim–Sulaiman providing the background score. The lyrics were penned by Prasoon Joshi. 5 songs are featured in the movie while the soundtrack contains 7 songs. This was the last film for which Jatin–Lalit composed as a duo (they split afterwards).

Gaurav Sathe of Planet Bollywood gave 8 stars stating, "Jatin–Lalit's last offering doesn't give us a DDLJ, a K2H2 or a K3G, but it is still a notch higher than some of the run–off–the–mill music we've been hearing as of late." According to the Indian trade website Box Office India, the album sold 17,00,000 units.

Salim–Sulaiman programmed for the first 5 songs and Dhrubajyoti Phukan programmed the song "Destroyed in Love".

Aamir Khan and Kajol recite lines of poetry in "Mere Haath Mein" and "Chanda Chamke".

Accolades

Controversy 
While promoting the film in Gujarat, Aamir Khan made some comments regarding the Gujarat Chief Minister Narendra Modi's handling of the Narmada Dam and the necessity to rehabilitate the displaced villagers. These comments were met with outrage from the Bharatiya Janata Party. The government of Gujarat demanded an apology from Khan. Khan refused to apologise, saying "I am saying exactly what the Supreme Court has said. I only asked for rehabilitation of poor farmers. I never spoke against the construction of the dam. I will not apologise for my comments on the issue." An unofficial ban of Fanaa was put in place for the entire state of Gujarat. Protests occurred against the film and Khan which included the burning of posters of the star in effigy. As a result, several multiplex owners stated that they could not provide security to customers. Thus, all theatre owners in Gujarat refused to screen the movie.

Producer Aditya Chopra moved a petition to the Supreme Court of India asking them to direct the Gujarat government to provide protection to all cinema halls that wanted to screen the film, but was rejected. Their response was that if a cinema was concerned for their protection they could call on the police.

Addressing the media, director Kunal Kohli said, "All theatre owners or exhibitors who wish to release this film can request for protection and the government should extend support. We as filmmakers request all theatre owners of Gujarat to come forward and release the film. We have earned 470 million (both domestic and overseas) in the first week and have lost approximately 6 to 70 million of business in Gujarat. However it's not about money... it is about a principle. As a democratic country where Aamir has a right to say what he feels, even the people of Gujarat, who are protesting have the right to say what they feel ... but in a democratic fashion, and not by burning posters and threatening people."

A single privately owned cinema in Jamnagar, Gujarat, screened the movie with police protection despite the threats. It ran for over a week before being withdrawn again following a self–immolation bid by a man protesting against the screening. The man, Pravin, entered the bathroom of the theatre during intermission of one of the screenings and set himself on fire. He suffered 85% burns and succumbed to his wounds nine days later.

See also 

 List of highest–grossing Bollywood films

References

External links 
 
 

2000s Hindi-language films
2006 films
Yash Raj Films films
Films about terrorism in India
Films set in Jammu and Kashmir
2006 crime drama films
Films shot in Poland
Films scored by Jatin–Lalit
Films shot in Delhi
2006 romantic drama films
Indian romantic drama films
Films set in Delhi
2000s Urdu-language films
Kashmir conflict in films
Films about blind people in India
Films directed by Kunal Kohli
Films about nuclear war and weapons